Charles Blackwell may refer to:

 Charles Blackwell (engineer) (1843–1906), civil engineer
 Charlie Blackwell (1894–1935), American baseball outfielder
 Charles Blackwell (music arranger) (born 1940), English record producer, arranger and songwriter
 Charles W. Blackwell (1942–2013), American Chickasaw Nation diplomat and lawyer